Poompuhar may refer to:

Poompuhar, a town in Tamil Nadu, India
Poompuhar Assembly constituency
Poompuhar (film), a 1964 Tamil epic film